Steve Snitch (born ) is an English professional rugby league footballer, who currently plays in the Kingstone Press Championship for Doncaster.

Snitch was born in Kingston upon Hull, and has previous played at club level for Wakefield Trinity (two spells), the Huddersfield Giants and the Castleford Tigers (Heritage № 902). Snitch played for Huddersfield in the 2006 Challenge Cup Final from the interchange bench against St. Helens but Huddersfield lost 12–42. In 2013 Snitch played for the Cairns based  Super Cup team, the Northern Pride.

References

1983 births
Living people
Castleford Tigers players
Doncaster R.L.F.C. players
English rugby league players
Featherstone Rovers players
Huddersfield Giants players
Northern Pride RLFC players
Rugby league players from Kingston upon Hull
Rugby league second-rows
Wakefield Trinity players